Eduardo "Yayo" de la Torre Menchaca (born 4 December 1962) is a Mexican former professional footballer and manager.

In December 2010 he was appointed as one of the assistant managers to his cousin José Manuel de la Torre for the Selección de fútbol de México (Mexico national team).

References

1962 births
Living people
Mexican football managers
Footballers from Jalisco
Xerez CD footballers
Santos Laguna managers
C.D. Guadalajara managers
Chiapas F.C. managers
Mexican footballers

Association footballers not categorized by position